Defiance is an unincorporated community and census-designated place in Broad Top Township, Bedford County, Pennsylvania,  United States. The village was home to 239 residents, as of the 2010 census. It is located along Six Mile Run Road (State Route 1036).

The community most likely was named in pioneer days after Fort Defiance.

Demographics

Education
Public education in Defiance is administered by the Tussey Mountain School District, which operates Defiance Elementary School within the community.

References

Populated places in Bedford County, Pennsylvania